Propebela arctica is a species of sea snail, a marine gastropod mollusk in the family Mangeliidae.

Description
The length of the whitish, ovate-fusiform shell varies between 7.5 mm and 13 mm. The aperture and the spire have about the same length. The shell contains five whorls. These are longitudinally eroded with angulated and nodulose plicae and transversely by obscure grooves. The body whorl is swollen. The aperture is ovate. The thin, outer lip is expanded. The siphonal canal is short.

Distribution
This species occurs in the Barents Sea, the Sea of Japan and in the Bering Strait.

References

 Bogdanov I. (1990). Mollusks of Oenopotinae Subfamily (Gastropoda, Pectinibranchia, Turridae) in the seas of the USSR. Leningrad 221 p

External links
  Merkuljev A.V. (2017). Taxonomic puzzle of Propebela arctica (A. Adams, 1855) (Gastropoda, Mangeliidae) - six different species under single name. Ruthenica. 27(1): 15–30
 
 Nekhaev, Ivan O. "Marine shell-bearing Gastropoda of Murman (Barents Sea): an annotated check-list." Ruthenica 24.2 (2014): 75

arctica
Gastropods described in 1855